Henry Compton may refer to:
 Henry Compton (bishop) (1632–1713), English bishop and nobleman
 Henry Compton, 1st Baron Compton (1544–1589), English peer, MP for Old Sarum
 Henry Combe Compton (1789–1866), British Conservative Party politician, Member of Parliament for South Hampshire, 1835–1857
 Henry Compton (actor) (Charles Mackenzie, 1805–1877), English actor
 Henry Compton (MP) (c. 1584–c. 1649), English politician who sat in the House of Commons variously between 1601 and 1640
 Henry Francis Compton (1872–1943), British Conservative politician